Middle Sister can refer to:
The Middle Sister of the Three Sisters, a group of volcanic mountain peaks in Oregon
Middle Sister (California), a peak in the Sweetwater Mountains of California
Middle Sister Island, a Canadian island in Lake Erie
The Middle Sister, a 1960 novel by Lois Duncan